XHURM-FM is a radio station on 102.1 FM in Uruapan, Michoacán. It is owned by Radiorama and carries its La Mexicana grupera format.

History
XEURM-AM 1440 received its concession on November 30, 1994, owned by Radiorama subsidiary Radio Olin, S.A. The AM station later moved to 1050, and then 750 in a swap with XEIP-AM. It became an FM migrant in 2011.

In 2015, XHURM-FM moved from 25 kW at a site in Tejerías to Cerro de la Cruz and slashed its ERP to 3 kW.

References

Radio stations in Michoacán